is a 1975 Japanese martial arts film directed by  Kazuhiko Yamaguchi and starred by Etsuko Shihomi. This film is a sequel to Sister Street Fighter (1974) and Sister Street Fighter: Hanging by a Thread (1974).

Plot

Cast
 Etsuko Shihomi as Lǐ Hóng-Lóng (Li Kōryū)
 Yasuaki Kurata as Go Kurosaki
 Akane Kawasaki as Xiu-Li (Shurei)
 Miwa Cho as Li-Hua (Reika)
 Mitchi Love as Michi Katahira
 Jirō Chiba as Xiang De-Ki (Sho Tokki)
 Rinichi Yamamoto as Wang Long-Ming

Reception
Matt Paprocki from the website "DoBlu" gave the film three out of five stars and wrote: "A highlight reel of its predecessors, Return of the Sister Street Fighter isn't one for original ideas, but it's still a goofy blast of fun". Don Anelli from the "Asian Movie Pulse" said: "With some engaging action and a lot to really like elsewhere, Return of Sister Street Fighter returns to the fun of the original even with some of the same problems that emerged in the previous entry as the flaws are just a touch more enhanced here. Give this one a shot if you've made it this far in the series or just looking for a light, breezy action film while those looking to get more out of their films should heed caution". David Brook from the online magazine Blueprintreview wrote about the Sister Street Fighter series of films, giving it three and a half stars out of five and stating: "So, the films in the set are flawed, with a little too much repetition and perhaps the first three could have benefitted from a breather here and there in amongst the near-constant fighting. The fourth film goes too far the other way, lacking the energy of its predecessors, but regardless, the films are a lot of fun. With lashings of gore, high-quality martial arts sequences with wacky flourishes thrown in to the mix, they'll be sure to please fans of Japanese genre movies".

References

External links 
 

1975 films
1975 martial arts films
Films directed by Kazuhiko Yamaguchi
1970s Japanese-language films
Karate films
Toei Company films
The Street Fighter
Japanese sequel films
Films scored by Shunsuke Kikuchi
1970s Japanese films